The enzyme casbene synthase (EC 4.2.3.8) catalyzes the chemical reaction

geranylgeranyl diphosphate  casbene + diphosphate

This enzyme belongs to the family of lyases, specifically those carbon-oxygen lyases acting on phosphates.  The systematic name of this enzyme class is geranylgeranyl-diphosphate diphosphate-lyase (cyclizing, casbene-forming). Other names in common use include casbene synthetase, and geranylgeranyl-diphosphate diphosphate-lyase (cyclizing).  This enzyme participates in diterpenoid biosynthesis.

References

 

EC 4.2.3
Enzymes of unknown structure